Rudolph Jay Schaefer I (February 21, 1863 - November 9, 1923) was the president of F. & M. Schaefer Brewing Company.

Biography
He was born on February 21, 1863, in Manhattan, New York City, to Maximilian Karl Emil Schaefer (1819–1904) and Ernestina Catherine Johanna Mathesius (1832–1898).  He married Frederica Vilette Beck on October 15, 1890, in Manhattan.  He died of pneumonia on November 9, 1923, in Larchmont, New York.

References

1863 births
1923 deaths
People from Manhattan
Businesspeople from New York City
Deaths from pneumonia in New York (state)